Créteil Cathedral is a Roman Catholic church in Créteil, Val-de-Marne, France. The present cathedral was completed in 2015, replacing the previous building. It is the seat of the Bishopric of Créteil, created in 1966.

First building
The first cathedral on the site was formerly a parish church opened on 18 June 1976, which was chosen as the cathedral of the new diocese in 1987. A modest structure, as was the wish of the ecclesiastical authorities of the period, it was located between the district of Montaigut and the Université Paris XII Val-de-Marne.

Before the consecration in 1976, the interim cathedral of the diocese was the church of Saint Louis and Saint Nicholas at Choisy-le-Roi.

Present building
On 19 and 20 June 2010 a project was announced ( the Projet Créteil Cathédrale+) to bring about the transformation of the original modest cathedral building into a more welcoming, more luminous and more visible symbol of the presence of the Church in Val-de-Marne. The works began in 2013 with the demolition of the initial building. The new cathedral, designed by the architect Charles-Gustave Stoskopf, opened for worship in 2015.

References

Sources and external links
 
 Catholic Hierarchy: Diocese of Créteil
 Website of Projet CréteilCathédrale+ 

Roman Catholic cathedrals in France
Churches in Val-de-Marne